Danielli Yuri-Barbosa (born January 3, 1984) is a judoka from Brazil.

Biography
Yuri-Barbosa was born in Registro, São Paulo, but she lives in São Caetano do Sul.

She began with judo in Japan. When she was little her family moved to Japan to make some money. Her father worked there in factories and when they came back to Brazil he opened a judo school.

Yuri likes to be with her family, she likes reading, watching movies. Her favorite actor is Samuel L. Jackson. She can't to say "no" when somebody asked her for a favor and during matches she uses same hairgrip.

Before 2008 Olympic Games in Beijing Brazilian Judo Federation was hesitated who will represented Brazil in half-middleweight. They hesitated between mature Vânia Ishii and young Yuri, but Yuri was chosen.

Judo
At the 2008 Olympic Games in Beijing she was eliminated in the first round by Korean Kong Ja-young. It was an aggressive match where Yuri was leading by wazari but two minutes before the end she made a mistake and Kong won by ippon.

Achievements

References

External links
 
 
 Facebook 

1991 births
Living people
Sportspeople from São Paulo (state)
Judoka at the 2008 Summer Olympics
Judoka at the 2007 Pan American Games
Olympic judoka of Brazil
Brazilian female judoka
Brazilian people of Japanese descent
Pan American Games silver medalists for Brazil
Pan American Games medalists in judo
Medalists at the 2007 Pan American Games
People from Registro